General (Retd.) Mohammed Abdul Mubeen is a retired Bangladeshi General who served as the Chief of Army Staff of the Bangladesh army from 2009 to 2012. Prior to his service as Chief of Army Staff, Mubeen served as Principal staff officer of the Armed Forces Division. Before then, he served as General Officer Commanding of 24th Infantry Division & 55th Infantry Division. He retired from the army in 2012 after serving as army chief.

He is currently the Chairman & nominated director of United Power Generation & Distribution Company Limited.

Education 
He was a cadet of Mirzapur Cadet College, Tangail. He was commissioned into the Infantry Regiment (East Bengal Regiment) of the Bangladesh Army on 30 November 1976. Mubeen is a graduate of both Defence Services Command and Staff College (DSCSC) and National Defence College (NDC) at Mirpur, Dhaka. As an army officer, Mubeen has completed various training programs including NATO Weapon Conversion Course, Infantry Weapon Course, Senior Command Course etc. and attended workshops and seminars in at least 15 countries, including India and China.

Career
Mubeen served in various capacities at a battalion level, including commanding two infantry battalions and an infantry brigade. At the staff level, he served as brigade major (operation staff) in an independent infantry brigade headquarters, general staff officer first grade (operation staff) in infantry division headquarters and in Bangladesh Military Academy, private secretary to the Chief of Army Staff and director of military training directorate at the Army Headquarters. He also held the important appointment of director general of Bangladesh Institute of International and Strategic Studies (BIISS) and principal staff officer (PSO), Prime Minister's Office, Armed Forces Division (AFD). He was commandant of the Defence Services Command & Staff College. He has commanded two infantry divisions, Jessore and Chittagong, as the general officer commanding (GOC). In the international platform, the General rendered his service as a peacekeeper in the capacity of chief of staff (Northern Region) in United Nations Operation in Mozambique (ONUMUZ).

Personal life
He is married to Syeda Sharifa Khanom, and have two sons and a daughter. His elder son is a third-generation army officer; Mubeen's father was an army officer as well. He enjoys golfing as a pastime, and was a decorated player in the Army Hockey Team during his early days.

Honours

References

Living people
1955 births
Chiefs of Army Staff, Bangladesh
Bangladesh Army generals
Principal Staff Officers (Bangladesh)